Kiana Swift (born 14 September 2000) is a Canadian-Tongan football player who plays as a midfielder. She is a member of the Tonga women's national football team.

Swift is from Sooke, British Columbia and was educated at Mt. Douglas Secondary School. Originally a rugby player, she switched to soccer at the age of nine after suffering an injury. In 2014 she played for the Vancouver Island Wave U15 girl's team which won the Provincial Premier Cup. In 2017 she was selected for the UNBC Timberwolves women's soccer team. She played for the Timberwolves while studying at the University of Northern British Columbia.

In 2022 she was selected for the Tonga women's national football team for the 2022 OFC Women's Nations Cup. She scored the goal which led to Tonga drawing with the Cook Islands in its second pool match.

References

Living people
2000 births
People from the Capital Regional District
Canadian people of Tongan descent
Tonga international footballers